Cheverell may refer to:

 Great Cheverell, Wiltshire, England, United Kingdom
 Little Cheverell, Wiltshire, England, United Kingdom
John Cheverell, English politician